Arseniy Olegovich Protsyshyn (born 29 August 1995) is a Ukrainian professional footballer who plays as a right-back for Krystal Kherson.

Career
Protsyshyn began his career in Ukraine with UFC Dnipro and Metalurh Donetsk, featuring for both at youth level. He then moved to Vorskla Poltava, with whom he failed to make a first-team appearance but was an unused substitute on one occasion for a Ukrainian Cup victory away to Nyva Ternopil on 23 August 2014. Protsyshyn made subsequent moves to Sumy and Sokil Zolochiv prior to leaving Ukrainian football for Slovakia's Teplička nad Váhom. He featured seven times towards the end of the 2015–16 2. Liga, including his debut versus Tatran Prešov. Sumy of the Ukrainian First League resigned Protsyshyn in 2016.

Fifteen appearances followed for Protsyshyn in his second spell with Sumy, before he left to spend the rest of 2016–17 with Rochyn Sosnivka. 2017 saw Protsyshyn sign for Polish IV liga side Cuiavia Inowrocław. He netted seven goals in his first campaign. In the next season, he completed a loan up three divisions to play for Bytovia Bytów in the second tier. Protsyshyn's first appearance came in a win away to Bruk-Bet Termalica Nieciecza, which preceded his opening goal for Bytovia Bytów against GKS Tychy on 8 September 2018. Protsyshyn, after seventeen appearances for Bytovia, returned to his parent club in June 2019.

On 31 July 2019, Protsyshyn terminated his contract with Cuiavia Inowrocław. A serious injury prevented the defender from joining a new club, though FC Mynai of the Ukrainian First League allowed him to train with them during his rehabilitation period; with interest of a permanent contract. However, upon recovery, Protsyshyn rejoined Cuiavia Inowrocław and subsequently scored three goals in eleven total matches in 2019–20. He cut short his contract in December 2019, departing his second stay early by two months. Protsyshyn, soon after, agreed a move to Austrian Regionalliga team SK Bischofshofen.

Career statistics
.

References

External links

1995 births
Living people
Place of birth missing (living people)
Ukrainian footballers
Association football defenders
Ukrainian expatriate footballers
2. Liga (Slovakia) players
Ukrainian First League players
Ukrainian Amateur Football Championship players
IV liga players
I liga players
FC Vorskla Poltava players
PFC Sumy players
FC Sokil Zolochiv players
OFK Teplička nad Váhom players
FC Rochyn Sosnivka players
Cuiavia Inowrocław players
Bytovia Bytów players
FC Kryvbas Kryvyi Rih players
FC LNZ Cherkasy players
FC Krystal Kherson players
Expatriate footballers in Slovakia
Expatriate footballers in Poland
Expatriate footballers in Austria
Ukrainian expatriate sportspeople in Slovakia
Ukrainian expatriate sportspeople in Poland
Ukrainian expatriate sportspeople in Austria